Ehrmann is a German surname. Notable people with the surname include:

 Aleksandar Ehrmann (1879–1965), Croatian industrialist, philanthropist and diplomat
 Eric Ehrmann (born 1946), American author
 Gerry Ehrmann (born 1959), German football coach and former player
 Jacques Ehrmann (1931–1972), French literary theorist
 Joe Ehrmann (born 1949), former National Football League (NFL) defensive lineman
 Kurt Ehrmann (1922–2013), German footballer
 Marianne Ehrmann (1755–1795), one of the first women novelists and publicists in the German-speaking countries
 Max Ehrmann (1872–1945), American poet
 Salomon Ehrmann (1854–1926), Jewish-Austrian dermatologist and histologist
 Thierry Ehrmann (born 1962), French entrepreneur and artist

See also
 Stade Charles-Ehrmann, football stadium in Nice, France
Ehrman, a similar name

German-language surnames